AEF may refer to:

 Aboriginal Evangelical Fellowship, Australia
 Afrique Équatoriale Française or French Equatorial Africa 
 Agricultural Industry Electronics Foundation
 Air Experience Flight
 Allied Expeditionary Force in World War II
 American Eagle Foundation
 American Expeditionary Forces, in World War I
 Asia Education Foundation
 Asian Pacific American Bar Association Educational Fund
 Association de l'enseignement français
 Astana Economic Forum
 Aviation Environment Federation
Agence d'Essais Ferroviaires (in English: Railway Testing Agency), a SNCF division of laboratory and facilities to carry out testing in a variety of areas: mechanics, electrics, industrial hygiene, and the environment